The Korniakt Palace on Market Square in Lviv is a prime example of the royal kamienica, or townhouse. The fabric of the palace is of various dates. It was originally built by Polish architect Piotr Barbon for merchant Konstanty Korniakt, a champion of Greek Orthodoxy and co-founder of the Lviv Dormition Brotherhood. Construction of this severely elegant Renaissance palazzo was completed in 1580.

After Korniakt's death in 1603, King Władysław IV Vasa stayed at his palace. He got smallpox and recovered here. In 1640, the edifice was purchased by Jakub Sobieski and was later inherited by his son, King John III Sobieski. The Polish-Lithuanian ruler remodelled it into a palatial residence, with spacious rooms and an audience hall where he signed the Eternal Peace Treaty of 1686.

In 1908, the Sobieski Palace became home to the Jan III museum. It is now part of the Lviv History Museum. The royal chambers are used for exhibiting Rococo furniture and clocks, a collection of medallions, and precious silverware.

See also
Constantine Corniaktos

References 
 Вуйцик В. С., Липка Р. М. Зустріч зі Львовом. Львів: Каменяр, 1987. С. 50.
 Памятники градостроительства и архитектуры Украинской ССР. Киев: Будивельник, 1983–1986. Том 3, с. 42.

Historic house museums in Ukraine
Houses completed in 1580
Museums in Lviv
Palaces in Ukraine
Residences of Polish monarchs
Royal residences in Ukraine
16th century in Ukraine

1580s establishments in the Polish–Lithuanian Commonwealth
Renaissance architecture in Ukraine